The World Association for Medical Law (WAML) was formally established in 1970. It is a not-for profit organization, and according to its statutes, its purpose is to encourage the study and discussion of problems concerning medical law, forensic and legal medicine and ethics, and their possible solution in ways that are beneficial to humanity and advancement of human rights.
The aim of the WAML is to promote the study of the consequences in jurisprudence, legislation and ethics of developments in medicine, health care and related sciences.
Members of WAML are both individuals holding an academic degree and interested in the field and both local organizations and institutes dealing with medical law, bioethics and health law from different countries in the world.

Medical Law
Medical Law concerns the rights and duties of the health professions and is thus directly linked to professional liability and the field of Bioethics. [1]
Some consider medical law a scientific discipline closely related to the advancement of health related technology over the last 60 years. Others link this field mainly to malpractice claims.
This growing field of academic research is also of very practical nature, as it pertains to real every-day situations in the hospital, in a clinical trial, and in many other health related settings.
The development of the field of medical law led to the establishment of Courses on medical law in various law schools, dentistry schools, medical schools, nursing schools etc. Also, some universities now offer LLM and even JSD or PhD specializing in health law and medical law.
At same time, many countries have local organizations and associations of medical law.

Structure

 The Board of Governors (BoG) is a body of representatives from various countries. Each member of the BoG represents a different country and is elected at the General Assembly held during each World Congress.

 The Council of Presidents (CoP) brings together leaders of national, regional and international organizations to exchange ideas and discuss issues that may prevail in a particular part of the world and for which others may be able to offer solution.

The Executive Committee (EC) is leading the association with the President, Vice president, Secretary General and Treasurer

World Congresses
Since its creation the WAML held 23 World Congresses for Medical Law, in various countries in the world, in 2017 World Congress was in Baku, Azerbaijan for the Golding Anniversary Meeting[3]. Future World congresses will be held in 2018 in Tel Aviv, Israel and 2019 in Tokyo, Japan.

International Journal of Medicine and Law
The journal (in-chief editor:Prof. Roy Beran)  is being published for over 30 years. It has published more than 2,000 articles, written by hundreds of experts from more than 100 countries around the  world. All publications go through a rigorous peer-review process and are handled by an elaborated editorial board.  The journal has been pronounced by the Kennedy Institute of Ethics as a "priority journal".[5]

References
 
 WAML statutes, approved by the General Assembly on 9 August 2006, Article 3. <http://www.thewaml.com/97918/WAML-Statutes>
 See complete list of congresses in the WAML publication appearing on: http://www.thewaml.com/97918/About-WAML
 see website of the 2012 World Congress of Medical Law: http://www.2012wcml.com/
 See more information about the journal on the website of the International Center for Health, Law and Ethics: http://www.ichle.com/87091/Management
 WAML radio is available at: http://www.wamlradio.org

International medical and health organizations
Medical law
Organizations established in 1970
International organisations based in Belgium